Thomas Rymour (died 26 February 1408) of Bath, Somerset, was an English politician.

He was a Member (MP) of the Parliament of England for Bath in 1406. He committed suicide, burning down his chamber  the day after he and his sister-in-law, who apparently perished in the same fire, both made wills.

References

14th-century births
1408 deaths
English MPs 1406
People from Bath, Somerset
Suicides by self-immolation
Suicides in England